Jonas Quant, also known simply as Quant, is a Swedish record producer, songwriter and remixer from Gothenburg.

In 2010, Quant co-produced English duo Hurts' debut album Happiness, which became the fastest-selling debut album of that year by a band in the United Kingdom. Quant has also collaborated with artists such as No Doubt, Kylie Minogue, Leona Lewis, Agnes Carlsson, Petra Marklund and Dolores Haze. 

As a solo artist, Quant released music in the late 1990s and early 2000s on the Swedish record label Dot.
In 2015, Quant helped British pop singer Foxes write her second studio album All I Need.

On March 16, 2021, it was announced that Jonas is the artist behind the first Swedish NFT that will be auctioned to highest bidder on March 26, 2021. https://www.dreamfng.com/

Discography

Studio albums
 Quantastical Quantasm (2000)
 Getting Out (2004)
 WNDBLWS (2020)

Extended plays
 Breaking & Entering (1997)
 Quant (1997)
 Funkster EP (2002)

Singles
 "Tik Tok" (2000)
 "Miracle Man" (2003)
 "Tryin'" (2004)

Selected songwriting discography
Hurts
No Doubt
Kylie Minogue
Agnes Carlsson
Leona Lewis
Dolores Haze
Tosca 
Similou 
Coldcut
Laura Welch (co-produced with Emile Hayne)
Kaskade (remix)

References

External links
 

1973 births
Living people
Musicians from Gothenburg
Swedish electronic musicians
Swedish record producers
Swedish songwriters
Remixers